Frank Abbott (September 5, 1836 – April 20, 1897) was president of the American Dental Association (1888), president of the National Association of Dental Faculties (1895), a renowned dentist, an author on dental subjects, and an inventor of dental instruments such as various types of chisels, pluggers, excavators and scalers, some of which are still in use in the 21st century.

Background
Born to a transplanted English family, Abbott attended local schools in York County, Maine and farmed in Shapleigh, Maine until the age of 16, when he began to travel. Beginning in 1855, he studied dentistry under Dr. J.E. Ostrander in Oneida, New York. At age 22, Abbott opened his own dental practice in Johnstown, New York, and married Catherine Ann Cuyler, with whom he had three children.

Upon the outbreak of the American Civil War, Abbott served as a lieutenant of the 115th New York Volunteer Infantry and was captured at Harper's Ferry, West Virginia. He was released from captivity as a part of a prisoner exchange.

Dental career
After the Civil War, Abbott returned to his practice. A year later, he matriculated as a medical student at the City University of New York. While there, Abbott was appointed as clinical lecturer in New York College of Dentistry (1866), as Professor of Operative Dentistry (1868) and as dean, (1869).

From 1894 - 1895, Abbott failed in attempts to have the trustees there establish a Chair of Pathology and Bacteriology (with his son as incumbent) and to have the University of New York regents replace an act of incorporation of the college with a new regent-approved charter. 

Abbott also invented the first automatic mallet with an effective back-action. He also collected rare American history prints.

Notable publications
Light vs. Heavy Gold Foil and Crystal Gold
Transactions of the American Dental Association, 1870, pp. 130–33
Indigestion, It's Causes and Effects
Translations of the State Dental Society of New York, 1875, pp. 39–48
Caries of the Teeth
Dental Cosmos, XXI, 1879, pp. 56–64, 113-25, 177-84
Pericementitis (Perostitis), Its Causes and Treatment
Dental Cosmos, XXV, 1883, pp. 418–23
Microscopical Studies upon the Absorption of the Roots of Temporary Teeth
Translations of the State Dental Society of New York, 1884, pp. 45–53
Hyperostosis of Roots of Teeth
Transactions of the American Dental Association, 1886, pp. 105–24
Odontoblasts in Their Relation to Developing Dentine, 1888, pp. 112–22
Odontoblasts in Their Relation to Developing Dentine, 1889, pp. 39–53
Growth of Enamel
Dental Pathology and Practice (1896 textbook)

See also

References
Johnson, Allen, ed.  Dictionary of American Biography.  New York:Charles Scribner's Sons, 1936.
Who Was Who: Historical Volume, 1607-1896, Chicago: Marquis Who's Who, 1967.

1836 births
1897 deaths
American dentistry academics
19th-century American inventors
City University of New York alumni
People from York County, Maine
People from Johnstown, New York
Union Army officers
American people of English descent
American Civil War prisoners of war
19th-century American dentists
Inventors from Maine